John Whitworth may refer to:
 John Whitworth (RAF officer) (1912–1974), Royal Air Force pilot
 John Whitworth (musician) (1921–2013), English countertenor, organist, and teacher of music
 John Whitworth (poet) (1945–2019), British poet

See also
 Johnny Whitworth (born 1975), American actor